Tropic Nights is a studio album by Mexican singer Elvira Ríos, released in 1940 by Decca Records. The album was received positively by critics.

Critical reception 
Tropic Nights received positive reviews in the early 1940s. Stage commended both Ríos' performance and Morand's orchestra: "Miss Rios displays perfect diction, great charm, and above all, a lovely voice. The orchestra accompanies in the best Latin tradition". Harper's Bazaar described the album's tracks as "Mexican and Cuban melodies smolderingly interpreted by Elvira Rios". Commonweal recommended it: "Decca has a good album called Tropic Nights, Mexican songs suavely delivered by Elvira Rios".

Decca reissued the album in the late 1940s and 1950s. In his 1947 book Records for Pleasure, music editor John Ball, Jr. wrote: "Miss Rios has mastered completely the intimate style of half-voice singing that can make of a Spanish song a most potent and intoxicating brew". In 1952, High Fidelity reviewed the album and highlighted Ríos' talent and prestige:

Track listing

References

External links 
 Tropic Nights at Discogs

1940 albums
Decca Records albums
Spanish-language albums
Elvira Ríos albums
Mexican folk music
Cuban folk music